Phavaraea rejecta is a moth of the  family Notodontidae. It is found in South America, including Brazil.

External links
Species page at Tree of Life project

Notodontidae of South America
Moths described in 1832